Mystrocnemis bicolor is a species of beetle in the family Cerambycidae. It was described by Per Olof Christopher Aurivillius in 1914.

Subspecies
 Mystrocnemis bicolor occidentalis Breuning, 1956
 Mystrocnemis bicolor bicolor Aurivillius, 1914

References

Saperdini
Beetles described in 1914